Emigration from Germany:
For a general overview of the topic, see German diaspora
For the emigration of German Jews during the Nazi regime, see Emigration of Jews from Nazi Germany and German-occupied Europe
For historical emigration patterns to Central and Eastern Europe, see:
Ostsiedlung
History of German settlement in Central and Eastern Europe
For the instrumentalization of ethnic Germans in Central and Eastern Europe by the Nazi regime, see Volksdeutsche

See also
:Category:German emigrants